The Olin Palladium Award (formerly the Palladium Medal Award) was established by The Electrochemical Society (ECS) in 1950 and is presented every 2 years to recognize outstanding contributions to the fundamental understanding of all types of electrochemical and corrosion phenomena and processes. 

The award consists of a uniquely designed palladium medal bearing the medalist’s name. The design of the medal depicts Pallas Athene employing a shield, on which the seal of the Society is inscribed, to protect the metals represented by ancient symbols from the elements, earth, air, fire, and water. Recipients are also presented with a wall plaque, cash prize, Electrochemical Society Life membership, and a free meeting registration.

History 
The Palladium Medal Award was initially funded by the royalties derived from the sales of the Corrosion Handbook and a gift of palladium metal from the International Nickel Company. The original purpose of the medal was to encourage research and achievement in the study of the corrosion of metals and its control, or in theoretical electrochemistry upon which the understanding of corrosion is based. 

In 1971 the scope was modified, and in 1977 the name was changed to The Olin Palladium Award after a generous endowment from the Olin Company.

Recipients 

As listed by ECS:

 2019 Shimshon Gottesfeld
 2017 Philippe Marcus
 2015 Digby MacDonald
 2013 Ralph E. White
 2011 Koji Hashimoto
 2009 
 2007 Sergio Trasatti
 2005 Robert A. Rapp
 2003 Eliezer Gileadi
 2001 Norio Sato
 1999 John B. Goodenough
 1997 Royce W. Murray
 1995 Jerome Kruger
 1993 Jean-Michel Savéant
 1991 John S. Newman
 1989 Brian Evans Conway
 1987 Allen J. Bard
 1985 Martin Fleischmann
 1983 Morris Cohen
 1981 Izaak Kolthoff
 1979 Roger Parsons
 1977 Heinz Gerischer
 1975 Marcel Pourbaix
 1973 Veniamin Levich
 1971 Leo Brewer
 1969 Thomas P. Hoar
 1967 Paul Delahay
 1965 Norman Hackerman
 1961 Herbert H. Uhlig
 1959 Alexander Frumkin
 1957 Karl-Friedrich Bonhoeffer
 1955 Ulick Richardson Evans
 1953 Nathaniel H. Furman
 1951 Carl Wagner

See also

 List of chemistry awards

References

External links

Olin Palladium Award 

Chemistry awards
Awards established in 1951